Somali mythology covers the beliefs, myths, legends and folk tales circulating in Somali society that were passed down to new generations in a timeline spanning several millennia. Many of the things that constitute Somali mythology today are traditions whose accuracy have faded away with time or have transformed considerably with the coming of Islam to the Horn of Africa.
 	
The culture of venerating saints and the survival of several religious offices in modern Somalia show that old traditions of the region's ancient past had a significant impact on Islam and Somali literature in later centuries. Similarly, practitioners of traditional Somali medicine and astronomy also adhere to remnants of an old cultural belief system that once flourished in Somalia and the wider Horn region.

Pre-Islamic period
 
The Somali people in pre-Islamic times are believed to have adhered to a complex belief System, with a set of deities superseded by a single all-powerful figure called Eebbe/Waaq (God, also known in Oromo as Waaq). Religious temples dating from antiquity known as Taallo were the centers where important ceremonies were held led by a Wadaad priest. Waaq was a pre-Islamic Sky God associated with water/rain, fertility, sacred trees, animals, nature, peace and harmony. It is construed in Somali with words like Bar waaqo ("bountiful"), Ceel Waaq (a town's name) and Cabu Waaq ( a town in central Somalia mostly populated by the Marehan clan).

Deities

Legendary kings, queens and saints
In Somali mythology, there is an abundance of tales about men and women who defied cultural traditions or acquired heroic and saintly status amongst the masses of the Somali Peninsula.

Arraweelo (Queen) Queen Arraweelo was a legendary queen, who empowered women's rights. Many epics support the legend of Arraweello as a defining female leader in her era.

Giants and demons

Mythological places
Many regions of Somalia have cities or specific areas whose names corroborate the stories told in Somali mythology. Waaq in itself is a Somali word and are used to name places such as Abudwaaq ("Worshiper of God"), Ceel Waaq ("Well of God") and other similar towns with the name Waaq in it suggest a relation to the old Waaq worship practiced in the Horn. The Tomb of Arrawelo is another popular mythological place in Somalia said to be the final resting place of Queen Arrawelo. In modern times, it is considered an important place for Somali women.

References

Further reading 

 
 
  Accessed 31 Dec. 2022.
 Kapchits, Georgi (1986). "On subjects and Motifs of Somali Folk-tales (experience of cataloguing)". Paper presented at Third International Congress of Cushitic and Omotic languages.
 Kapchits, Georgi. "On types of Somali folk-tales". In: Mohamed Mohamed Abdi (a cura di). Anthropologie somalienne. Actes du IIe Colloque des Etudes Somaliennes (Besançon - 8/11 octobre 1990). Les Belles Lettres, 1993. pp. 247-250.
  Accessed 31 Dec. 2022.
 Rooble, Cabdullaahi Xasan [Roble, Abdullahi Hassan]. Sheeka-Bareyaal Soomaaliyeed [Somali Folktales]. Scansom Publishers, 2000.

Somali culture
African mythology
Ancient Somalia